Hinduism is a minority religion in French Guiana, introduced and practiced mostly by the Indians in French Guiana, who are approximately 12,000 individuals. As of 2010, Hinduism is followed by 1.6% of the population of French Guiana.

History
The abolition of slavery by France in 1848 created a labour crisis in its three colonies (now overseas departments) in the Caribbean. French Guiana received labourers from Java and India. French Guiana received 19,276 indentured labourers from India.

References

Religion in French Guiana
 
French Guiana